Lucciola is an Italian trattoria restaurant that serves Italian cuisine in New York. It was founded in 2017 in New York City by Michele Casadei Massari along with Alberto Ghezzi. It serves typical food from the Italian city of Bologna located in the area of Emilia Romagna. The name "Lucciola" means firefly, and was inspired by Pasolini article.

History
Lucciola is the second restaurant by Michele Casadei Massari, with Piccolo Cafe being the first one. It pays homage to Festa di Laurea director Pupi Avati. Lucciola focuses on Emilia Romagna cuisine, wines, and traditional Italian desserts such as Tortellini, Albana di Romagna, Tiramisu, and Pasta al pomodoro.

References

Companies based in New York City
Restaurants in New York City
Restaurant chains in the United States
Italian restaurants in New York (state)
2017 establishments in New York City
Restaurants established in 2017